

Spdfgh ( were an Australian rock band from the 1990s. The founding members were: Kim Bowers (as Wikky Malone) (guitar, vocals), Liz Payne (as Rosy Glo, Lou Marvel, Belle) (guitar, vocals), Tania Bowers (as Tania May) (bass guitar, vocals), Melanie Thurgar (as Finnius) (drums),
and Angela Morosin (vocals).

Name origin
In chemistry, the letters (spdfgh...) are used when determining the number of electrons in the shells of an atom (the letters denote the first six states of orbital angular momentum in atomic physics). TV Week magazine called it "the dumbest name in Australian rock".

The band name came about this way: Liz Payne's brother Geoff and friend Paul Hillard were studying for their Higher School Certificate physics exams, and recited "spdfgh" to aid recall of this topic. Soon, this became the title of a song (written by Hillard, Geoff Payne and Crowe) for Geoff's band Wilson Tuckey Goes To Hobart. Liz also wrote songs for Wilson Tuckey Goes To Hobart, as did Mel Thurgar, and both performed with WTGTH in the early to mid-'90s. Kim and Tania Bowers also featured briefly in WTGTH before all the girls decided to pursue spdfgh only.

History
The original members got started playing together at St. Patrick's College (Campbelltown, southwest of Sydney). A very early gig was the St Patrick's School disco and featured the unreleased "Help! Help! It's a dance party!"  The band and Morosin parted company soon after high school.

In their early days, to get noticed, they would travel to Sydney, sneak into soundchecks of bands they liked and just start playing. Payne left after the group had recorded Leave Me Like This and Sally Russell (later known as New Buffalo, Sally Seltmann) briefly replaced her on guitar in mid-1995. Russell, still a member of power pop group Lustre 4, had co-written the track "You Made Me" with Tania (later known as Via Tania) for that album. Russell continued her work with Lustre 4 and was replaced in Spdfgh by Christina Hannaford by the time the album was issued.

The band had songs included on the soundtracks of the films Love and Other Catastrophes and The Well.

Since breaking up, the members have pursued new projects.

 Kim Bowers recorded some electronic tracks under the name of 'Deep in Sound', which appeared on the soundtrack to the 1999 Australian film, Fresh Air. Most recently she has been working with her sister Candy Bowers on hip-hop group / theatrical performers Sista She.
 Tania Bowers went on to Godstar, contributed songs to the Fresh Air soundtrack under the name of "Sunday", and has since released an album under of the name Via Tania—with help from her husband, sound engineer Casey Rice. In April 2020, under the name T Wilds, Tania released a single "I Swim" from forthcoming album due out 2021.
 Payne went on to Rocket and Sonic Emotion Explosion, both with former Gerling guitarist Brad Herdson. The duo has since renamed themselves to Little Sky and turned into a fully-fledged band.
 As of 2009, Thurgar is drumming in Sydney-based Hard Rock outfit Death By Proxy.

Discography
 "In Me" on Eddie Magazine compilation CD (1993)
 Nighttime 7-inch (Dirt Records, 1994)
 Grassroots EP (Half a Cow, 1994) (also licensed to Dirt Records)
 "Sweet" on Gay Pride split 7-inch EP with Chumbawamba and Pansy Division; Rugger Bugger Records (1995)
 Wikky's Ode Single (Half a Cow, 1995)
 Leave Me Like This LP (Half a Cow, 1995)
 Small Mercy EP (Half a Cow, 1995) (bonus cd with Leave Me Like This LP)
 Give Me Time Single (Half a Cow, 1995)
 The Pseudo Blues Single (Half a Cow, 1996)
 Hide, as Liz Payne and Spdfgh, on Half a Cow promotional compilation Heard It Through The Bovine

See also
 List of all-women bands

References

External links
Half a Cow Records – Spdfgh
History at Music Australia

All-female bands
Australian indie rock groups